Heinz Kleimeier (born 1 October 1941) is a German water polo player. He competed in the men's tournament at the 1968 Summer Olympics.

References

External links
 

1941 births
Living people
German male water polo players
Olympic water polo players of West Germany
Water polo players at the 1968 Summer Olympics
Sportspeople from Hamm